This is a list of NUTS2 statistical regions of Sweden by Human Development Index as of 2021.

References 

Human Development Index
Sweden

Sweden